MyCiti is a bus rapid transit service with feeders, which forms part of a greater Integrated Public Transport driven economic development strategy of the City of Cape Town Municipality (CoCT) in South Africa. The service is being rolled out across the  Cape Metropole, and provides a significantly enhanced public transport system in about 10% of the City. The service commenced in 2010 with Phase 1, which features buses running north to south along the west coastline of the City.

By 2015 MyCiTi provided a rapid bus service between Blouberg / Table View, Atlantis, Melkbosstrand, Dunoon, Milnerton, Paarden Eiland, Century City, Khayelitsha, Mitchells Plain and Cape Town Central. It also provided feeder services in most of the above areas as well as in Salt River, Walmer Estate, and all suburbs of the City Bowl and Atlantic Seaboard all the way to Llandudno and Hout Bay.

The service uses high floor articulated and standard size buses in dedicated busways, low floor articulated and standard size buses on the N2 Express service, and smaller 9m Optare buses in suburban and inner city areas. It offers universal access through level boarding and numerous other measures, and requires cashless fare payment using the EMV compliant smart card system, called myconnect. Headway of services (i.e. the time between buses on the same route) range from 3 mins to 20 mins in peak times to 60 minutes during quiet off-peak periods.

In November 2015 approximately 60,000 daily passenger journeys were made on the MyCiTi service, on 36 routes, using 42 bus stations and more than 600 bus stops, in about 223 peak buses.

The most recent expansion of MyCiTi services occurred in October 2018, when it added 120 000 scheduled kilometre through artificial troops on existing routes and some new routes. It also added more direct services which don't require transfers between different routes, as well as additional bus stops.

History 
MyCiTi began operations in May 2010, shortly before the 2010 FIFA World Cup, providing a shuttle service from the Civic Centre (where a new bus terminus was constructed) to Cape Town International Airport. It also included a temporary loop around the City Bowl for the duration of the World Cup.

The first proper bus rapid transit (BRT) phase (Phase 1A) opened in May 2011. It includes a dedicated West Coast busway from the city centre through Milnerton to Table View, along which an express bus service operates. Connecting to this trunk route is a route in the City Bowl connecting Gardens, the Civic Centre bus station and the Waterfront, as well as three feeder services around Table View, Bloubergstrand and Parklands.

In 2012, the first MyCiTi began using its first custom-built 9-metre Optare Solo bus as part of its fleet. The bus was part of an order of 190 units, to be assembled in Epping by Busmark 2000, and used as feeder buses. The Optare Solo's shorter size allows it to maneuver easily in residential and dense city areas.

Major expansion of services occurred from late 2013. They include new routes around Table View and Parklands and links to: Century City via Racecourse Road and Omuramba roads; Montague Gardens along Koeberg Road; Killarney, Dunoon and Doornbach via Blaauwberg Road; Sunningdale and Sandown stations on the West Coast Road; Melkbosstrand; Atlantis, Mamre and Pella.

The MyCiTi bus service has also been extended to Cape Town's south-east, to Khayelitsha and Mitchells Plain, called the N2 Express. It uses Bus and Minibus-taxi (BMT) lane on the N2 highway, which permits public transport vehicles to pass general traffic during the morning peak period.

Aim
The service aims to provide comfortable, convenient, reliable, safe, efficient, car-competitive public transport in Cape Town. The City of Cape Town has built upon the MyCiTi service, and expanded it to form Transport for Cape Town (TCT), its transport authority. TCT aims to implement the "vision of one" in which a single integrated ticketing system and timetable will be implemented for bus and rail (PRASA) transport.

Station artwork

In October 2010 the City of Cape Town put out a call for proposals for artists and designers to create artwork on the glass panels at the entrance of the MyCiTi stations.

References

External links

 Official website

Transport in Cape Town
Bus rapid transit in Africa
Rapid transit in South Africa